Aladdin Malikov (born 16 September 1982, Sumgayit, Azerbaijan SSR) is a teacher, Azerbaijanian religion philosopher, Assistant to the President of ANAS. Who works primarily in the fields of philosophy, logic, epistemology, philosophy of religion, history of philosophy, orientalist, and translator. Editor-in-Chief of the International Journal of Metafizika, Doctor of Philosophy, Associate Professor.

Early life and education 
Aladdin Malikov was born on 16 September 1982 in Sumgayit, Azerbaijan SSR.

Education 
The name of the educational institutions:
 Z. Najafov full secondary school, Secondary education, 1989-2000, Attestat.
 World Academy of Islamic Sciences, Theology, 2000-2005, Bachelor's.
 Mofid University, Methodology of philosophy and science (in western philosophy), 2005-2007, Master's.
 Mofid University, History of Philosophy, 2007-2011, Ph.D.
 Tarbiat Modares University, Philosophy, Transcendental theosophy, 2011-2013, Doctor of Science in Philosophy (Post Ph.D). 
 The Higher Attestation Commission under the President of the Republic of Azerbaijan, Associate Professor (DS № 05993), 2017- ...

Creativity 
From the first years of the university, he has published articles in various media in the religious, historical, philosophical, scientific, social and literary fields. He is the author of many books on philosophy, science, and literature. He has also been the translator and editor of several books. His books have been published in the country and abroad. He has written and published some books, as well as a full member of the editorial board of many magazines. He has cooperated with leading research centers in foreign countries and has been closely involved in the review of scientific books and articles

Career 
 Embassy of the Republic of Azerbaijan to the Islamic Republic of Iran, Translator and General Affairs, 2009-2012.
 Al-Mustafa International Research Institute, Leading researcher, 2007-2010.
 ANAS, Institute of Oriental Studies named after Academician Ziya Bunyadov, Senior scientific worker, 2013-2014.
 Translation Centre Cabinet of Ministers of the Azerbaijan Republic, Department of control official correspondence, Language Specialist, 2014-2018.
 ANAS, Institute of the History of Science, Leading scientific researcher, 2018
 Azerbaijan Institute of Theology, The department of religious studies, Teacher, 2018
 Editor-In-Chıef in the “Metafizika” Journal (International Journal of Philosophy and Interdisciplinary Studies),, 2017
 He is an assistant to the President of the Azerbaijan National Academy of Sciences.
 Elected Chairman of "Virtual Electronic Activity Society" (VEAS) under the Presidium of ANAS established on September 25, 2020

Awards and Prizes 
 Tusi Islamic Republic of Iran have been awarded in science.
 President of the Islamic Republic of Iran, as well as "blessed prize" was awarded for his research epistemology.
 Islamic Republic of Iran ", Allamah Hilli" was awarded the prize for the youths.
 Winner of the grant competition announced by ANAS.

See also 
 Azerbaijan National Academy of Sciences
 Al-Mustafa International University
 Metafizika Journal
 Theology Institute of Azerbaijan

References

External links 

 Ələddin Məlikovun Beynəlxalq bilim insanları və akademik tədqiqatçılar saytındakı Rəsmi Vebsəhifəsi (Az dilində)
 Ələddin Məlikovun Beynəlxalq bilim insanları və akademik tədqiqatçılar saytındakı Rəsmi Vebsəhifəsi (İngilis dilində)
 Ələddin Məlikovun Beynəlxalq bilim insanları və akademik tədqiqatçılar saytındakı Rəsmi Vebsəhifəsi (Fars dilində)
 Aladdin Malikov on Google Scholar

1982 births
Living people
Azerbaijani philosophers
Religion academics
Arabists
Azerbaijani orientalists
21st-century Azerbaijani historians
Tarbiat Modares University alumni
Cultural academics
People from Sumgait